The parable of those who associate partners with God is a Quranic parable which appears in chapter Al-Hajj of the Quran. The foolishness of those who invoke or worship anything besides God is presented in this parable.

This parable demonstrates the unity of God. As God is one and has no partners, there can be no partners associated with him nor can any worship, including prayers, be directed toward others to seek help and protection.

Narrative 
The parable is as follows:

This parable illustrates the futility of false worship and reality of associating partners with God.

Another parable with same message:

Interpretation
This parable appears in the Al-Hajj immediately after verses 71 - 72 that help to explain the meaning of the parable:

In one of the most celebrated Quranic tafsir or interpretation called Maariful Quran by scholar Muhammad Taqi Usmani says that by citing this parable the Quran illustrates the foolishness of those who worship false deities besides God.

References

Parables in the Quran